Caroline Dubois (born 1960) is a French poet who lives and works in Paris.  Her writing is close to dialogue and she often collaborates with other artists in readings or performances.
A presentation of her work appeared in Cahier du Refuge n°: 69, 121.

Works 
 
 
 
 
 
 
 
Comment ça je dis pas dors, 2009
C'est toi le business, 2005
 Le rouge c’est chaud, Vacarme 28, Summer 2004 (Prose).
 Niente, Vacarme 26, Winter 2004  (Prose).
 Malécot, éditions contrat maint, 2003, 
 Summer is ready when you are, with Françoise Quardon and Jean-Pierre Rehm, éditions joca seria, 2002
 pose-moi une question difficile, éditions rup&rud, 2002, 
 Arrête maintenant, éditions l’Attente, 2001
 Je veux être physique, Farrago, 2000, 
 A series of storyless playlets: "Va Cherche les mots mais comment les trouver" is, for example, a reflection on poetry.
 La réalité en face/la quoi ?, Al Dante/RROZ, 1999. (in collaboration with Anne Portugal)

External links
 Interview translated by Cole Swensen

1960 births
Living people
French women poets
21st-century French non-fiction writers
21st-century French women writers